Adako is an unincorporated community located in Caldwell County, North Carolina.

References

Unincorporated communities in North Carolina